The 1945 SANFL Grand Final was an Australian rules football game contested between the Port Adelaide Football Club and the West Torrens Football Club, held at Adelaide Oval in Adelaide on 29 September 1945. It was the 47th Grand Final of the South Australian National Football League, staged to determine the premiers for the 1945 SANFL season. The match, attended by 47,500 spectators, was won by West Torrens by a margin of 13 points, marking that club's third premiership victory. The game is also remembered for being the final game of Haydn Bunton Sr's career.

Background 
This was the first SANFL Grand Final held after World War Two, with Japan surrendering 27 days prior to the game.

Match summary

First quarter 
Port Adelaide's first quarter score of 8.3 (51) remains the largest opening term to any SANFL grand final.

Second quarter

Third quarter

Fourth quarter

Teams

Scorecard

Post game

Record attendance 
The crowd of 47,500 broke the attendance for a football match in South Australia that was previously 44,300 held by the 1924 SAFL Grand Final.

Haydn Bunton Sr last game 
The 1945 SANFL Grand Final was Haydn Bunton Sr's last game.

References

Bibliography

SANFL Grand Finals
SANFL Grand Final, 1945